Bodyboarding is a water sport in which the surfer rides a bodyboard on the crest, face, and curl of a wave which is carrying the surfer towards the shore. Bodyboarding is also referred to as Boogieboarding due to the invention of the "Boogie Board" by Tom Morey in 1971. The average bodyboard consists of a short, rectangular piece of hydrodynamic foam. Bodyboarders typically use swim fins for additional propulsion and control while riding a breaking wave.

Origin 
Bodyboarding originates from an ancient form of riding waves (surfing) on one's belly. Indigenous Polynesians rode "alaia" (pronounced ah-lie-ah) boards either on their belly, knees, or feet (in rare instances). Alaia boards were generally made from the wood of Acacia koa and varied in length and shape. They are distinct from the modern stand-up surfboards in that they had no ventral fins. Captain Cook recorded seeing Hawaiian villagers riding such boards when he came to Hawaii in 1778.

Alaia boards then evolved into the more modern "paipo" (pronounced pipe-oh) board. Paipo boards were either made of wood or fiberglass. Fiberglass boards usually had fins on the bottom. Tom Morey hybridized this form of riding waves on one's belly on a paipo to his craft of shaping stand-up surfboards.

Different Riding forms 
Bodyboards are shaped to the rider's specific needs and preferences such as height, weight, and form of riding. Three basic forms of riding a bodyboard include prone, dropknee, and stand-up.

Prone 

Riding prone refers to when one rides the wave on their stomach. When the bodyboarder goes left, they place their left hand on the upper left corner of the nose and place their right arm halfway down the rail of the right side of the board. The opposite is true of when the bodyboarder goes right.

Dropknee 

Dropknee is when one places their preferred fin forward on the front of the deck with the opposing knee on the bottom end of the board with their fin dragging in the water. Dropknee was first pioneered in the late 1970s by Hawaii's Jack "The Ripper" Lindholm and sometimes referred to as "Jack Stance". Unlike fiberglass stand-up surfboards, the bodyboards dropknee riders use don't have fins underneath to help maintain a line on the face of a wave or to stop them sliding out so dropknee riders rely on weight transition from rail to rail to hold a line on a wave and turn/snap. On the other hand, the benefit of not having fins underneath the board is that a rider can spin 360 (forward and reverse).

Stand-up 
Stand-up consists of standing upright on the board and performing tricks on the face as well as in the air. While it isn't quite as popular as the other two forms of riding a bodyboard, three notable figures that popularized it are Danny Kim, Cavin Yap, and Chris Won Taloa.

The board

Materials 
The bodyboard differs from a surfboard in that it is much shorter (typically  in length) and made out of different types of foam. The modern board consists of a foam 'core' encapsulated by a plastic bottom, a softer foam top known as the deck, and softer foam sides known as the rails. The core is made of dow/polyethylene, arcel, polystyrene, or Polypro/polypropylene. The bottom is made of Surlyn, HDPE or Bixby. The deck is made of 8LB or CrossLink. Each type of foam core, deck, or bottom material gives a bodyboard a different amount of flex and control. Speed from the bottom turn is increased when a bodyboarder bottom turns and the board flexes and recoils, releasing energy. If the board flexes too little or too easily, speed is lost. Dow (polyethylene) cores are best suited to cooler waters as they can be too flexible in warm water. Arcel and Polypro (polypropylene) cores are best suited for warmer waters due to their increased overall stiffness.

Most boards on the market today contain one, two, or three rods (usually of carbon or graphite), referred to as stringers, to strengthen the board, reduce deformation, add stiffness and recoil to the core, thus providing greater speed off bottom turns and transitions on the wave. If a single stringer is used, it is placed in the center of the board running parallel to the rails. If two are used, they are placed symmetrically about the y-axis. Triple stringers are a combination of the placement of both a single and double stringer.

Construction 
Deck, rails, and bottom are bonded via various hot air lamination techniques to the core. Previous to the lamination technique, shapers accomplished this by using glue.

Features 
The shape, or curve, of the board affects how it rides. If the wide point of the board is nearer to the nose, the board tends to be best suited to prone riding as the bodyboarder's weight rests further up on the board. Boards with more parallel rails or a narrow nose tend to be more ideal for drop-knee and stand-up riding as the rider's center of gravity tends to rest further back.

Most modern boards are equipped with channels that increase surface area in the critical parts of the board which, in turn, allow it to have varying hold and control on the wave. Originally, skegs were installed to decrease slippage on a wave face. However, progressive bodyboarding has rendered use of such skegs obsolete due to the looseness required for maneuverability on a wave. For such reasons, skegs are rarely used today and, even then, almost exclusively by dropknee or stand-up bodyboarders.

Tail shapes influence the way that boards perform in the line-up. Crescent tails provide the greatest amount of hold in steep waves. Crescent tails are generally preferred by drop-knee riders because the shape interferes less. Crescent tails are also preferred by beginners, due to being able to perform well in varying conditions. Bat tails provide looseness for rail to rail transitions. Prone riders tend to prefer bat tails more than dropknee riders.

Progression 

From the conception of the modern bodyboard in 1971, bodyboarding has experienced spurts of rapid growth both as an industry and extreme sport. With its origins in America, over the past decade the industry has shifted from a primarily American to a global industry phenomena. The sport has grown into a worldwide industry with growing strongholds in Australia, South American countries like Peru and Chile, Japan, Canary Islands (Spain), South Africa, and so forth. The evolution of maneuvers and waves in which it is being done have rendered it one of the most extreme wave riding forms in the world.

Bodyboarders have been accredited with pioneering some of the world's heaviest, most renowned surf locations in the world: Teahupo'o, French Polynesia; Shark Island, Australia; El Fronton, Spain; Cyclops, Australia; Ours, Australia; Luna Park, Australia; etc. In addition, bodyboarders place strong emphasis on aerial maneuvers on bigger, heavier sections of waves. These include aerial 360s, ARS (Air Roll Spin), el rollos, inverts (tweaking the board with the momentum of the wave and then swinging it back), backflips, ATS (Aéreo Thiago Schmitd) and variations/hybrids of these maneuvers are also performed. Notable accomplishments for prone aerial maneuvers include:

El Rollo: Originally completed simultaneously by Hawaii's Pat Caldwell at Sandy Beach & Hawaii's Mike Stewart at Kona breaks such as Kahalu'u Bay.
Reverse Rollo: Originally completed by Kauai's Kyle Maligro. 
Invert: Unknown.
ARS (Air Roll Spin): Originally completed by Australia's Michael Eppelstun. Argued that California's Jacob Reeve completed it at the same time.
Backflip: Originally completed by Australia's Michael Eppelstun.
Double Rollo: Originally completed by Australia's Michael Eppelstun.
Air forward 360°: Originally completed by Hawaii's Mike Stewart.
Air reverse 360°: Originally completed by Hawaii's Mike Stewart.
Air Hubb (Forward air to el rollo): Originally completed by Kauai's Jeff Hubbard.
Gainer Flip: Originally completed by Tahiti's David Tuarau. 
GORF (Invert to front flip forward): Originally completed by Nathan "Nugget" Purcell.
Invert to Reverse 360° "Inverse": Originally completed by Kauai's Jeff Hubbard.
Devert (Invert to reverse el rollo): Originally completed by Kauai's David Phillips.
Air reverse 720°: Originally completed by Hawaii's Jeff Hubbard.
ATS - Aéreo Thiago Schmitd (Thiago Schmitd's Air): Originally completed by Brazil's Thiago Schmitd

Male bodyboarders 

 Mike Stewart (Hawaii, USA) is considered the father of modern bodyboarding, acclaimed as one of the best wave riders of all time, and holds nine world titles. He is also the only bodyboarder to receive the Mr. Pipeline title.
 Ben Severson (Hawaii, USA) is a pioneer of bodyboarding, world champion, and competitive rival of Mike Stewart for over fifteen years.
 Guilherme Tamega (Brazil) is second only to Stewart for number of world titles, holding six. He has gained reputation and fame for his aggressive riding style and approach in both small and heavy surf.
 Mike "Eppo" Eppulston is the first Australian and also the first non-Hawaiian to win the World Title (1993). He is also known for creating the ARS and backflip.
 Paul Roach (California, USA) is accredited with developing a new style of progressive dropknee riding in both small and large waves. He is also considered, by many, as the greatest dropknee rider of all time. 
 Matt Lackey (Coolangatta, Australia) currently rated by his peers as the best dropknee rider in the world. Known for tearing apart waves around the world such as Cloud 9, but best known for his dominance over his local break at Dbah in Australia.
 Jeff Hubbard (Hawaii, USA) is best known for his phenomenal aerial approach to bodyboarding. He currently holds three world titles.
 Ryan Hardy (Australia) is influential in the progression of Australian and international bodyboarding. Known for his fluid yet powerful style of surfing.
 Ben Player (Australia) is also considered one of the greatest influences in bodyboarding both Australia and the world. He holds three world titles.
 Andre Botha (South Africa) is the youngest athlete to win the world title (1998). He then won a second world title the next tour season of 1999. Known for his extreme approach to wave riding in shorebreaks and heavy waves.
 Brahim Iddouch (Morocco) is influential in the progression of Moroccan and international bodyboarding. Known for his fluid yet special and powerful style of surfing, and he's ranked 7 in the global bodyboarders ranking.
George Humphreys, Lewy Finnegan and Davis Blackwell are known for their body boarding film '3 Amigos'
Alexandre de Pontes (Xandinho), was the first Brazilian to reach the finals in the Pipeline world bodyboarding championship. Six-time world champion Guilherme Tâmega considers Xandinho one of the greatest bodyboarders of all time.
Hugo Pinheiro was placed second at the ISA World Surfing Games in 2006.

Female bodyboarders 
Phylis Dameron was the first person, man or woman, to ride big Waimea Bay on a bodyboard in the late 1970s. During the early 1990s in Brazil, Mariana Nogueira, Glenda Koslowski, and Stephanie Petterson set standards that pushed women's bodyboarding to a world class level. Stephanie Petterson won the first official World Championship of Women's Bodyboarding at Pipeline in 1990. It was the first women's event ever held there and initiated the longest running women's wave sport event in the world. 2009 marked the event's 20th anniversary.
Alexandra Rinder is the top ranked female bodyboarder in the world.
Sari Ohhara is the third ranked top female bodyboarder in the world. 
Jessica Becker is the fourth ranked top female bodyboarder in the world.

World Champions
From 1982 to 1993, the winner of the International Morey Boogie Bodyboard Pro Championships at Pipeline, Hawaii was considered world champion. Since then a world tour has determined the sport's champion. The world tour has been administered by a variety of organisations.

https://en.wikipedia.org/wiki/World_Tour_(bodyboarding)

Results

Men

Women

ISA World Bodyboard Championship

References

External links

 
Surfing
Boardsports
Individual sports